Diarrhea of a Madman is the debut album by the band Dave Brockie Experience. It was released in 2001 by Metal Blade Records.

Track listing

 Lady Died (live) (hidden track)- 15:15 into track 18.

References

External links
Diarrhea of a Madman on Metal Blade Records' website

2001 debut albums
Dave Brockie Experience albums
Metal Blade Records albums